Coleus neochilus, synonym Plectranthus neochilus, which is colloquially known as lobster bush, fly bush or mosquito bush, is a perennial ground cover with highly fragrant, partially scalloped, ovate leaves and  purple blue inflorescent spikes.

Description
The succulent, grey-green leaves present with small hairs on the tops, and a grey-green colour. The plant itself remains a ground cover for the duration of its life (45–60 cm), forming massive bushes rather quickly. The aroma of the plant has been said to resemble cannabis. They bloom twice a year, in late summer and in late winter.

The specific epithet neochilus is derived from the Latin word chilo, which refers to the calyx or lips.

Habitat
The plant is found in dry brush lands, open and sometimes rocky woodland, from the Western Cape, Eastern Cape, KwaZulu-Natal, Mpumalanga to Limpopo in South Africa, as well as in Zimbabwe, Zambia and Namibia.

Cultivation
Lobster bushes can tolerate wide temperature ranges, dry conditions and almost any soil, but prefer a well-drained sandy loam in full sun or partial shade. Hard pruning is suggested after flowering. Stems root very readily and the plant extends, where it forms a tidy cluster. Often planted in the landscape of difficult areas, the plant may become a little stressed in very dry conditions, but would revive when it receives some water. They can easily be propagated from softwood cuttings and would multiply in the garden. They are rarely affected by pests.

Uses
It is said that this plant can repel snakes, mosquitoes, flies and most garden pests as a result of its fragrant nature. This makes Coleus neochilus an ideal companion plant for vegetable gardens. Furthermore, reports point out that these plants can be used efficaciously as an air purifier.

The dried herb, known as "boldo" or "boldo-gambá", is employed for treating hepatic insufficiency and dyspepsia in folk medicine.

Tea made by steeping fresh leaves is similar to mint tea.

Gallery

References

neochilus
Flora of South Africa
Plants described in 1983
Garden plants of Southern Africa
Flora of Zambia
Flora of Namibia
Flora of Zimbabwe